Spodnje Sečovo ( or ) is a settlement in the Municipality of Rogaška Slatina in eastern Slovenia. It lies just northeast of the town of Rogaška Slatina. The entire area is part of the traditional region of Styria. It is now included in the Savinja Statistical Region.

References

External links
Spodnje Sečovo on Geopedia

Populated places in the Municipality of Rogaška Slatina